Rayborn is a surname. Notable people with the surname include:

Cal Rayborn (1940-1973), American motorcycle racer 
John Rayborn (born 1975), American football player
Kenny Rayborn (born 1974), American baseball player

See also
Rayborn, Missouri, a community in the United States